Tuvalu does not have any museums, however the creation of a Tuvalu National Cultural Centre and Museum is part of the government's strategic plan for 2018–24.

References 

Tuvalu
Tuvalu
Museums
Museums